Miankuh or Mian Kuh or Miyan Kuh (meaning "valley") may refer to:

Mian Kuh, Gilan, a village in Gilan Province, Iran
Miankuh, Kermanshah, a village in Kermanshah Province, Iran
Mian Kuh, Mazandaran, a village in Mazandaran Province, Iran
Miankuh Sadat, a village in Mazandaran Province Iran
Miankuh, Qazvin, a village in Qazvin Province, Iran
Mian Kuh, South Khorasan, a village in South Khorasan Province, Iran
Miankuh District, an administrative subdivision of Chaharmahal and Bakhtiari Province, Iran
Miankuh Rural District (disambiguation), various places in Iran